Zoran Lutovac (born 7 August 1964) is Serbian politician and former diplomat who has been the president of the Democratic Party since 2018. A former ambassador of Serbia to Montenegro between 2008 and 2013, he has served as one of the vice-presidents of the National Assembly of Serbia since 2022.

Biography
Zoran Lutovac was born on 7 August 1964 in Belgrade, SR Serbia, SFR Yugoslavia. His father was from Berane in Montenegro. Zoran Lutovac finished elementary school and high school in Belgrade. After high school, Lutovac graduated from the University of Belgrade Faculty of Political Sciences in 1988. He was awarded magister degree at the same Faculty in 1994.

Lutovac was a lecturer at the Belgrade Faculty of Political Sciences, and several other universities. Between 2001 and 2004, he was a member of the board of directors of the Zavod za udžbenike, apublic company issuing school textbooks, and president of the board of directors of the Belgrade Institute for European studies. Lutovac was advisor in the presidential campaign of Dragoljub Mićunović for the 2003 presidential election. and political advisor of Prime Minister of Serbia Zoran Đinđić. He was member of different government committees during the Đinđić and Živković cabinets (2001–2004). Lutovac was Serbian ambassador to Montenegro between 2008 and 2013.

Lutovac has been a member of the Democratic Party since 1996. He was chairman of the Party committee for ethnic minorities between 1997 and 2003. and chairman of the Party committee for human and minority rights between 2004 and 2008. He was member of the Political council of the Democratic party between 1997 and 2008 and again between 2013 and 2016, when he became the chairman of the Council. Lutovac was a candidate for the President of the Democratic party at the party election in 2016, but lost to Dragan Šutanovac. After Šutanovac resigned in 2018, Lutovac was elected President of the Democratic Party on 2 June 2018.

References

|-

Democratic Party (Serbia) politicians
1964 births
Politicians from Belgrade
Ambassadors of Serbia
Living people
Serbian people of Montenegrin descent
University of Belgrade Faculty of Political Science alumni